The Barossa Trail is a  cycling and walking path through the Barossa Valley in South Australia. Until 2019 the 27km between Gawler and Tanunda was named the Jack Bobridge Track.

The Jack Bobridge Track was named after Jack Bobridge, a cyclist grew up in the area. It was opened on 22 May 2014. Following Bobridge's imprisonment in July 2019 for dealing recreational drugs, the Barossa Council changed its name to the Barossa Trail, which was already the name for the shared path from Tanunda through Nuriootpa and on the former railway route to Angaston.

Much of the Barossa Trail follows the Barossa Valley railway line but is not a rail trail as part of the railway was still operating at the time it was built. As it is not on the railway formation it has more undulations than a true rail trail would have. The part near Rowland Flat is away from both the railway and main road. It has much sharper corners than would be expected on a rail trail.

Route description
The Barossa Trail begins adjacent to the railway line at Ann Milroy Lane in Kalbeeba on the eastern outskirts of Gawler. It follows the railway line through Sandy Creek, then crosses the railway using a short section of Cockatoo Lane. The track resumes adjacent to the Barossa Valley Way through gum trees then over a hill and descends into Lyndoch. From Lyndoch, the track follows the Barossa Valley Way, then next to the railway line to Rowland Flat. From Rowland Flat, the track is away from the road and railway, through vineyards and bushland near the North Para River and the Jacob's Creek visitor centre. This section has short steep sections and sharper corners, but also rewarding scenery. The track is again adjacent to the Barossa Valley Way from St Hallett Road to Tanunda.

The track continues from Tanunda to Nuriootpa then Angaston (this section was already known as the Barossa Trail prior to the decision to change the rest of the trail's name to match in 2019). The section between Nuriootpa and Angaston is on the former railway alignment, so has railway grades. The section from Tanunda to Nuriootpa is mostly flat. From Nuriootpa, The Barossa Trail follows the former railway alignment through vineyards and past the Adelaide Brighton Cement factory. It provides views across the valley from the eastern side, then passes through a cutting for the final descent to Angaston.

References

Cycling in South Australia
Cycleways in South Australia
Barossa Valley